Johnathan Jenkins (born July 11, 1989) is an American football nose tackle for the Miami Dolphins of the National Football League (NFL). He played college football at Georgia, and was drafted by the New Orleans Saints in the third round of the 2013 NFL Draft. He has also played for the Seattle Seahawks, Chicago Bears, and New York Giants.

Early years
A native of Meriden, Connecticut, Jenkins attended Francis T. Maloney High School, where he was a member of the Maloney Spartans high school football team.  He played defensive end and also occasionally appeared as fullback on short-and-goal situations (scoring four touchdowns as a senior).  Jenkins then attended Mississippi Gulf Coast Community College in Perkinston, Mississippi, where he recorded 41 tackles and two quarterback sacks as a sophomore.  Gulf Coast had a 19−5 record in his two seasons there.

College career
Jenkins received an athletic scholarship to attend the University of Georgia, and played for coach Mark Richt's Georgia Bulldogs football team in 2011 and 2012.  He was recruited by Richt to man the nose tackle position in Georgia's 3-4 defense, rotating with Kwame Geathers in the position.

Professional career

New Orleans Saints 
Jenkins was drafted in the third round, with the 82nd overall pick, by the New Orleans Saints in the 2013 NFL Draft.  Jenkins was signed by the Saints on May 10 to a four-year contract, the last of the 5 New Orleans picks to sign.

He was released by the Saints on November 9, 2016.

Seattle Seahawks 
On November 15, 2016, Jenkins was signed by the Seattle Seahawks.

Chicago Bears
On March 17, 2017, Jenkins signed with the Chicago Bears. He played in eight games for the Bears in 2017.

On April 7, 2018, Jenkins re-signed with the Bears on a one-year contract. He was released on September 1, 2018.

New York Giants
On September 4, 2018, Jenkins was signed by the New York Giants.

On May 13, 2019, Jenkins re-signed with the Giants. He was released on August 31, 2019.

Miami Dolphins
On September 2, 2019, Jenkins was signed by the Miami Dolphins.

Chicago Bears (second stint)
On April 28, 2020, Jenkins signed a one-year deal with the Bears. He was placed on the reserve/COVID-19 list by the Bears on July 30, and activated from the list four days later. He was placed on injured reserve on September 24, and was activated on October 16.

Miami Dolphins (second stint)
Jenkins signed with the Miami Dolphins on April 2, 2021. He re-signed with the team for another season on April 7, 2022.

References

External links
New Orleans Saints bio
Georgia Bulldogs bio

1989 births
Living people
American football defensive tackles
Chicago Bears players
Georgia Bulldogs football players
Miami Dolphins players
Mississippi Gulf Coast Bulldogs football players
New Orleans Saints players
New York Giants players
People from Meriden, Connecticut
Players of American football from Connecticut
Seattle Seahawks players
Sportspeople from New Haven County, Connecticut